En L'An 2000 (In the Year 2000, also loosely translated as France in the 21st Century) is a French image series depicting scientific advances imagined as achieved by the year 2000. At least 87 were produced, by artists including Jean-Marc Côté. They were printed in 1899, 1900, 1901 and 1910, first on paper as cigar box inserts, and later as picture postcards, but never distributed. The only known set of the postcards was acquired by writer Isaac Asimov, who featured them in his nonfiction work Futuredays: A Nineteenth Century Vision of the Year 2000 (Henry Holt and Company, 1986).

Gallery

See also

 Retrofuturism

References

External links 
 Publicdomain review

Postcards
1899 in France
Isaac Asimov
France in fiction
Fiction set in the 2000s
Science fiction images
1899 works